"Serenade" is the title song of the 1956 Warner Bros. motion picture of the same name. Written by Nicholas Brodsky and Sammy Cahn, it was sung on screen by Mario Lanza.

Track listing

Slim Whitman version 

In the same year, the song was released as a single by Slim Whitman. His version reached number 8 in the UK.

Track listing

Charts 
Mario Lanza version

Slim Whitman version

References 

1956 songs
1956 singles
Imperial Records singles
London Records singles
Mario Lanza songs
Slim Whitman songs
Songs written for films